Meyer Werft is one of the major German shipyards, headquartered in Papenburg at the river Ems. Founded in 1795 and starting with small wooden vessels, today Meyer Werft is a builder of luxury passenger ships. 700 ships of different types have been built at the yard. Its "Dockhalle 2" is the third largest shipbuilding hall and the building with the fifth-largest usable volume in the world as of 2022.

Meyer Werft has been owned and managed by the Meyer family for seven generations. Since 1997, it has been part of the Meyer Neptun Group, together with Neptun Werft in Rostock. In 2014, the company added the Turku shipyard in Finland to the group.

The shipyard is an anchor on the European Route of Industrial Heritage.

History
The shipyard was founded at the beginning of 1795 by Willm Rolf Meyer as a yard specializing in small wooden vessels. Josef Lambert Meyer began building iron vessels in 1874.
During the second world war, MeyerWerft mainly repaired ships, also ships from the Kriegsmarine. 
There were more than 20 dockyards in the Papenburg area, but today Meyer Werft is the only remaining shipyard in Papenburg. For seven generations it has been a privately held and family-owned company.

Company
Meyer Werft gained international recognition through the construction of roll-on/roll-off ferries, passenger ferries, gasoline tankers, container ships, livestock ferries and most recently luxury cruise ships.

Meyer is one of the largest and most modern shipyards in the world with about 3300 employees, and home to the largest roofed dry docks in the world. The first covered dock was inaugurated in 1987 and was 370 meters long, 101,5 meters wide and 60 meters high. In 1990/91 the dock was extended by an additional 100 meters. In 2004, a second covered dock was built, which is announced to be extended to a full length of 504 meters, a width of 125 meters and height of 75 meters in order to compete with Asian shipyards. Meyer Werft will as a result of this be able to build three cruise ships a year. Due to its upstream location on the river Ems, the giant ships to be delivered have to make a 36 km voyage to the Dollart bay and which each time attracts thousands of spectators. Up until the completion of the Ems river barrier ("Emssperrwerk") in 2002, the journey was only possible at high tides.

In September 2014 Meyer Werft acquired 70% ownership of STX Finland and the Turku shipyard STX Finland Oy from STX Europe with the state-owned Finnish Industry Investment owning the remaining 30%. The shipyard was renamed Meyer Turku Oy. Meyer Werft acquired the remaining 30% in 2015.

Ships built at Meyer Werft 
A large variety of ships have been built at Meyer Werft, including car carriers, cargo ships, container ships, cruise ships, ferries, fishing vessels, gas carriers, lightvessels, paddlesteamers, passenger ships and Seebäderschiffs.

List of shipyards
  Meyer Werft (located at Papenburg)
  Neptun Werft (located at Rostock)
  Meyer Turku (located at Turku)

References 
Hans Jürgen Witthöft, Meyer Werft- Innovative shipbuilding from Papenburg, Koehlers Verlagsgesellschaft mbH, Hamburg

External links

Homepage of Meyer Werft
Homepage of Neptun Werft
Homepage of Meyer Turku
Meyer Werft Shipyard in Google Maps

German companies established in 1795
Manufacturing companies established in 1795
Papenburg
Shipbuilding companies of Germany
German brands